Isidroa is a monotypic genus of flowering plants belonging to the family Verbenaceae. The only species is Isidroa spinifera.

Its native range is Hispaniola. It is found in Dominican Republic and Haiti.

The genus name of Isidroa is in honour of Isidro E. Méndez (b. 1958), a Cuban botanist and specialist in Verbenaceae, especially Lantana. The Latin specific epithet of spinifera refers to spiny, from 'spina' 'spinose'.
Both genus and species were first described and published in Willdenowia Vol.46 on page 16 in 2016.

References

Verbenaceae
Verbenaceae genera
Monotypic Lamiales genera
Plants described in 2016
Flora of the Dominican Republic
Flora of Haiti